Stanko Barać (born 13 August 1986) is a retired Croatian professional basketball player.

Professional career

Early years
Barać was born in Mostar, Bosnia and Herzegovina and he started his basketball career with the team Široki Prima pivo, from Široki Brijeg, Bosnia and Herzegovina.

He was selected by the Miami Heat as the 39th overall pick in the 2007 NBA Draft and was traded to the Indiana Pacers. In July 2016 they passed their rights to the Dallas Mavericks.

Spanish League
Barać remained in Europe, signing a five-year contract with Saski Baskonia, then known as TAU Cerámica, in August 2007. In the October of that year, just before the start of the European season, Saski Baskonia loaned him out to another ACB team, Pamesa Valencia for the 2007–08 season. He returned to Saski Baskonia the following season, and In November 2010, he signed a three-year contract extension that will keep him in Vitoria-Gasteiz through 2015.

Anadolu Efes
On 6 July 2011 he signed a three-year contract with Anadolu Efes of the Turkish Basketball League.

Cedevita Zagreb
On 5 January 2015 he signed a contract with the Croatian club Cedevita for the rest of the season. With Cedevita, he won the Croatian League and Cup.

EA7 Emporio Armani Milano
On 28 August 2015 he signed with EA7 Emporio Armani Milano of the Italian Lega Basket Serie A.

Croatian national team
He also plays for the Croatian national team.

References

External links
TBLStat.net Profile
Euroleague.net Profile
ACB.com Profile

1986 births
Living people
Croats of Bosnia and Herzegovina
ABA League players
Anadolu Efes S.K. players
Basketball players at the 2008 Summer Olympics
Centers (basketball)
Croatian expatriate basketball people in Italy
Croatian expatriate basketball people in Turkey
Croatian expatriate basketball people in Spain
Croatian men's basketball players
HKK Široki players
KK Cedevita players
Liga ACB players
Miami Heat draft picks
Olimpia Milano players
Olympic basketball players of Croatia
Saski Baskonia players
Basketball players from Mostar
Valencia Basket players